Supergirl is an American superhero television series developed by Ali Adler, Greg Berlanti and Andrew Kreisberg that aired on CBS and later The CW from October 26, 2015, to November 9, 2021. It is based on the DC Comics character of the same name, created by Otto Binder and Al Plastino. The series features Melissa Benoist in the title role. Supergirl is a costumed superheroine who is Superman's cousin and one of the last surviving Kryptonians from the planet Krypton. Starting with its second season, the show was retroactively established to be set in the Arrowverse, sharing continuity with the other television series of the franchise.

The series was officially picked up on May 6, 2015, after receiving a series commitment in September 2014 and received a full season order on November 30, 2015. Since the second season, the series has aired on The CW. The show has received generally positive reviews from critics, who have praised the creative direction, the performances, and the themes addressed.

Series overview

Kara Zor-El was sent to Earth from Krypton as a thirteen year old by her parents Zor-El and Alura. Kara was meant to protect her infant cousin, Kal-El, but her spacecraft was knocked off course and sent into the Phantom Zone, where it stayed for 24 years. By the time the spacecraft crash landed on Earth, Kal-El had grown up and become Superman. The series begins twelve years later when Kara is learning to embrace her own superhuman powers as a Kryptonian and has adopted the superheroine alias "Supergirl".

In the first season, Kara is forced to reveal her powers, and becomes National City's protector. In the process, she discovers that hundreds of the criminals her mother imprisoned are hiding on Earth, including her aunt Astra and Astra's husband Non. Kara works with her adoptive sister Alex Danvers to fight these criminals, alongside the Green Martian J'onn J'onzz, her cousin's friend James Olsen, and tech genius Winn Schott.

In the second season, Kara and her allies deal with feuds between Earth's native populace and extraterrestrial community, and investigate the shadowy organization Project Cadmus, masterminded by Lillian Luthor, mother of Lex Luthor. Meanwhile, Kara befriends Lillian's adoptive daughter, Lena Luthor, the new CEO of LuthorCorp, and struggles with romantic feelings for recent Earth arrival Mon-El, a princely survivor from Krypton's neighboring planet Daxam, whose parents wish to reclaim him. James becomes the masked vigilante Guardian; Alex begins dating Maggie Sawyer; and J'onn befriends a younger Martian, M'gann, from the White Martian race that killed his people.

In the third season, Kara struggles with the loss of Mon-El after he is forced to leave Earth. When Mon-El returns, he reveals that he has time-traveled to the 31st century and founded the Legion, as well as married Imra Ardeen. J'onn discovers his father M'yrnn J'onzz is alive and Alex deals with her heartbreak after breaking up with Maggie. Kara and Alex's new friend, Samantha Arias, discovers she is also a Kryptonian survivor, and begins a transformation from a loving single mother into the world-killing weapon known as Reign.

In the fourth season, Kara deals with a new wave of anti-extraterrestrial prejudice secretly instigated by Lex Luthor from prison, forcing her to fight for the civil and political rights of aliens. Ben Lockwood, a former college professor who suffered a series of personal tragedies at the hands of extraterrestrials, forms a human-first group called the Children of Liberty to end all aliens. Meanwhile, in the nation of Kasnia, a clone of Kara dubbed "Red Daughter" is trained by its military to fight Supergirl at Lex's request. Kara and Alex clash with the DEO's new addition, Col. Lauren Haley, who was sent to monitor the DEO's progress under Alex's direction. Col. Haley and the President try to force Supergirl to reveal her identity, and causing the feud to escalate when she refuses.

In the fifth season, CatCo. gets a new editor-in-chief in the form of Andrea Rojas. Kara and her friends find themselves facing a new threat known as Leviathan. Following a multiverse-destroying Crisis, Kara adjusts to her new life on the newly created "Earth-Prime", while being forced to work under Lex as Leviathan continues their covert operations under Gamemnae.

In the sixth and final season, Lex attempts to finish what the Anti-Monitor started after the latter failed in conquering the multiverse. He successfully imprisons Kara in the Phantom Zone as her friends figure out a way to bring her back out. Kara discovers her father in the Phantom Zone. After their rescue, Supergirl's group must contend with the 5th Dimension Imp Nyxlygsptlnz who also escaped the Phantom Zone and is seeking the different Totems to get revenge on her father King Brpxz. Lex Luthor soon gets involved with Nyxlygsptlnz.

Episodes

Cast and characters

 Melissa Benoist as Kara Zor-El / Kara Danvers / Supergirl: A 24-year old Kryptonian living in National City, who must embrace her powers after previously hiding them. She assists her adoptive sister Alex as part of the Department of Extra-Normal Operations (DEO) as she discovered the truth that her adoptive father also worked for the DEO so they would not take her, while Alex's co-workers at the DEO help her perfect her powers. Kara worked as Cat Grant's assistant at CatCo. Benoist expressed her excitement over portraying the character, and being able to "[tell] a story about a human being really realizing their potential and their strength". At the end of season one, Kara was promoted by Cat and became a junior reporter at the beginning of season two. Malina Weissman (seasons 1 and 2) and Izabela Vidovic (seasons 3, 4 and 6) portray a young Kara.
 Mehcad Brooks as James "Jimmy" Olsen / Guardian (seasons 1–5; guest: season 6): A former Daily Planet photographer, James moved to National City and became the new art director for his former colleague, Cat Grant, at CatCo Worldwide Media. He is initially a potential love interest for Kara. Among his reasons for moving across the country are his breakup with his fiancée, Lucy Lane, and keeping an eye on the newly revealed Supergirl for Superman. While working at the Daily Planet, James received the Pulitzer Prize for taking the first photograph of Superman. In the second season, James becomes Guardian. He also becomes the acting CEO of CatCo after Cat Grant leaves the company. In the fourth episode of season 5, James goes back to his hometown and uncovers a great deal of corruption going on at a new prison. By the episode's end, James decides to leave National City to run his hometown newspaper. He returns in the series finale to assist the Superfriends in the final battle against Lex and Nyxly and attend Alex and Kelly's wedding.
 Chyler Leigh as Alexandra "Alex" Danvers / Sentinel: Kara's human adoptive sister. She is a physician, scientist and government agent who serves as Hank Henshaw's right hand at the DEO. Having been extensively trained in combat by Henshaw, Alex in turn provides rigorous training to Kara in order to decrease her over reliance on her powers. She and Kara grow suspicious of the DEO upon learning that their missing father was forced to work there in order to protect Kara, but Alex ultimately learns that Henshaw is really the Martian survivor J'onn J'onzz in disguise, whom her late father had rescued before his and the real Henshaw's apparent deaths. In season two, Alex learns that her father is alive and searches for him. She also meets and befriends police detective Maggie Sawyer and begins to develop feelings for her, forcing Alex to confront her sexuality. Jordan Mazarati and Olivia Nikkanen portray a young Alex. At the end of season three, Alex becomes the new director of the DEO.
 Jeremy Jordan as Winslow "Winn" Schott Jr. / Toyman (seasons 1–3; guest: seasons 5–6):A tech expert who worked alongside Kara at CatCo, he is Kara's best friend and serves as one of her allies, helping her develop her costume and aiding her in her adventures. Winn has unrequited feelings for Kara and is a rival with James for her affection. However, at the end of "For the Girl Who Has Everything", Winn has accepted that it is best that they remain as best friends and in "Solitude", he begins seeing Cat Grant's new assistant, who is also Kara's rival; Siobhan Smythe, who is subsequently fired by Cat and who, in "Worlds Finest", becomes a supernatural metahuman supervillain called Silver Banshee. In the series, he is the son of Toyman. Cat nicknames him Toyman Junior after she finds out. In season two, Winn left CatCo to work at the DEO as a desk agent. He also works with James Olsen as his vigilante partner. At the end of season 3, he left for the future with Mon-El and joined the Legion of Superheroes. He returns in a two-part special episode in season 5, helping the Superfriends take down his evil doppelganger, and later in the series finale to assist them in the final battle against Lex and Nyxly and attend Alex and Kelly's wedding.
 David Harewood as J'onn J'onzz / Martian Manhunter: The head of the DEO who takes Hank Henshaw's likeness after Henshaw is killed in Peru while hunting J'onn. J'onn takes Henshaw's likeness in order to reform the DEO from within as well as to watch over Alex and Kara. The evolution of Henshaw was discussed during the filming of the pilot, with the executive producers jokingly saying that Harewood would be a good actor to play the Martian Manhunter in a potential television series, to which DC Comics' Geoff Johns asked why it could not be done in Supergirl. Harewood reflected that he had difficulty "find[ing] an angle to play Hank Henshaw" in the pilot, and became excited when he was told about the change to his character's backstory. Harewood also recurred in the series as the real Hank Henshaw, who became Cyborg Superman.
 Calista Flockhart as Catherine J. "Cat" Grant (season 1; recurring: season 2; guest: seasons 3–4 & 6): The outwardly shallow and superficial, but inwardly sweet, founder of the media conglomerate CatCo Worldwide Media, who feels, since she "branded" Kara as "Supergirl", that she has proprietary custody over the new hero. Before she founded CatCo, she was a gossip columnist at the Daily Planet, and before that, the personal assistant to the Daily Planet Editor-in-Chief, Perry White. Cat investigates and reveals that Supergirl is Superman's cousin, which then causes Kara to become a target for some of Superman's rogues gallery. Cat also serves as a mentor to Kara, dispensing advice about being a woman in a man's world. In the episode "Hostile Takeover", she suspects that Kara is Supergirl. In the second episode of season two, Cat announces that she is taking a leave of absence from CatCo, leaving James to run the company in her stead, although she returns at the end of the season to aid the heroes during the conflict with Queen Rhea. In season three, she became the White House Press Secretary for President Olivia Marsdin. In the series finale, Cat buys back CatCo and hires Kara as her new editor-in-chief, while also disclosing to Kara herself that she has always known of Kara's Supergirl identity. Shortly after, Cat gives an interview where Kara publicly reveals herself as Supergirl.
 Chris Wood as Mon-El / Mike Matthews  (seasons 2–3; guest: seasons 5–6): A prince from the planet Daxam with similar powers to Superman and Supergirl, Mon-El lands on Earth in the pod at the end of season one.
 Floriana Lima as Margarita "Maggie" Sawyer (season 2; recurring: season 3): A detective for the National City Police Department who takes a special interest in the cases involving aliens and metahumans. The first openly gay character introduced, Maggie dates Alex Danvers, even becoming engaged. However, this is broken off. Lima became a recurring actress for the third season, departing in the season's fifth episode. Lima noted the role was only intended to last for one season.
 Katie McGrath as Lena Kieran Luthor (seasons 3–6; recurring: season 2):The CEO of L-Corp (formerly known as Luthor Corp) and the younger paternal half-sister of Lex Luthor. She arrives in National City after Lex has been incarcerated, hoping to rebrand Luthor Corp as a force for good. As the daughter of Lionel Luthor, to whom she is close, Lena tries to redeem her family name after Lex's crimes have tarnished it and to break from her half-brother and step-mother's legacy. Initially, she believed that she was the adopted daughter of Lionel and Lillian Luthor, but Lena learns that she is actually Lionel's illegitimate child from his extramarital affair. Lena meets Kara after Kara is assigned to interview Lena about L-Corp. Shortly after, the two develop a very close relationship. Camille Marty portrays a young Lena.
 Odette Annable as Samantha "Sam" Arias / Reign (season 3; guest: season 5): Another Kryptonian sent to Earth as an infant and single mother to her daughter Ruby. Samantha's villainous alternate personality, Reign, emerges in the middle of season 3, but she is unaware of it and her alter ego's actions.
 Jesse Rath as Querl "Brainy" Dox / Brainiac 5 (seasons 4–6; recurring: season 3): A half-A.I., half-organic 12th-level intellect and member of the Legion of Superheroes from the planet Colu in the 31st Century.
 Sam Witwer as Benjamin Lockwood / Agent Liberty (season 4; guest: season 5): The brilliant, ruthless, and terrifying founder and figurehead of Children of Liberty, a human-supremacist hate group that supports a human-first world order.
 Nicole Maines as Nia Nal / Dreamer (seasons 4–6): A soulful young transgender woman with a fierce drive to protect others and the newest addition to the CatCo reporting team. The character is the first transgender superhero on television.
 April Parker Jones as Colonel Lauren Haley (season 4): A hardline career military woman who lives and dies by the orders of her commanding officers. Dedicated to her country, she always acts in its best interest — even if it's not her own.
 Azie Tesfai as Kelly Olsen (seasons 5–6; recurring: season 4): James's younger, no-nonsense sister, recently returned to the United States following a military tour overseas.
 Andrea Brooks as Eve Teschmacher (season 5; recurring: seasons 2–4; guest: season 6): A former CatCo assistant who became part of Lena's research team at L-Corp before being revealed as a dastardly turncoat spy working for Lex Luthor. She is also revealed to be an unwilling spy working for Leviathan, which has been manipulating Lex Luthor.
 Julie Gonzalo as Andrea Rojas / Acrata (seasons 5–6): A CEO of Obsidian Tech who is the new editor-in-chief of Catco Worldwide Media and an old friend of Lena Luthor.
 Staz Nair as William Dey (seasons 5–6): A new star reporter at Catco Worldwide Media who is secretly remains under the London Times newspapers' employ and undercover to investigates Andrea Rojas, suspecting that she is a criminal.
 LaMonica Garrett as Mar Novu / Monitor (season 5; guest: season 4): A multiversal being testing different Earths in the multiverse in preparation for an impending "crisis", providing the Book of Destiny to John Deegan, releasing J'onn J'onzz's brother, and retrieving the corpse of Lex Luthor. He made his first appearance in the Arrowverse crossover "Elseworlds".
 Garrett also portrays Mobius / Anti-Monitor, the Monitor's polar opposite, an evil being dedicated to ending the multiverse.
 Peta Sergeant as Nyxlygsptlnz "Nyxly" (season 6):  A 5th Dimension Imp princess who Kara meets in the Phantom Zone, who desires revenge on her father for banishing her and killing her brother, and is willing to do whatever is necessary to get it.

Production

Development
By September 2014, Warner Bros. Television was looking to create a television series centered around Supergirl. Executive producers for the series include Greg Berlanti (also a creator/producer for Arrow and The Flash), Ali Adler, who are both writing the script, and Berlanti Productions' Sarah Schechter. DC Comics' Geoff Johns is also expected to be part of the project. Titles under consideration for the series included Super and Girl. Berlanti confirmed the show shortly after, and stated it was in development and had yet to be pitched to networks. Berlanti's take on the character was based on the actress Ginger Rogers, who he felt "had to do everything Fred Astaire did but backward and in heels"; this comparison "really resonated" with executive producer Sarah Schechter. On September 20, it was announced that CBS had landed Supergirl with a series commitment, with an expected premiere in 2015 of the 2015–16 television season. In January 2015, CBS Entertainment Chairman Nina Tassler revealed the show would be a procedural, saying, "There will be [crime] cases, but what [executive producers] Ali Adler and Greg Berlanti pitched was a real series arc for her. The beauty of it is now with shows like The Good Wife and Madam Secretary, you can have serialized story elements woven into a case of the week. She's a crime solver, so she's going to have to solve a crime."

In January 2015, it was announced by The Hollywood Reporter that Melissa Benoist would star as Supergirl. Benoist later revealed that auditioning for the part "was a long, drawn-out, three-month process"; she was the first actress looked at for the role, although Claire Holt and Gemma Atkinson were also considered. In March 2015, Blake Neely, composer for Arrow and The Flash, revealed he would be composing for Supergirl. The show was officially picked up to series on May 6, 2015. It was originally set to premiere in November 2015, before being moved up to October 26, 2015. The pilot episode was screened at San Diego Comic-Con International 2015 on July 8 and 11, 2015. In July 2015, Adler spoke on how much influence Superman would have on the show, saying, "Our prototype is the way the president is seen on Veep. It's certainly [inspired by] so much of what Julia Louis-Dreyfus' character goes through. Ultimately, this is a show about Supergirl and we really want to see it through her lens." On November 30, 2015, CBS ordered an additional seven episodes of Supergirl, for a full season of 20 episodes.

On May 12, 2016, Warner Bros. Television announced that the series had been renewed for a second season of 22 episodes and would move to The CW. The season debuted in October 2016. With the move of the production to Vancouver, it was unclear if Calista Flockhart would remain with the series, as her original contract stipulated that she work near her home in Los Angeles. The CW president Mark Pedowitz said Flockhart wanted to remain with the series and that "We're in ongoing discussions... we're happy to have her in [in whatever capacity] works out." Flockhart ultimately reached a deal to be recurring in the second season, with the production flying her to Vancouver every few weeks to film material.

On January 8, 2017, The CW renewed the series for a third season, which debuted on October 9, 2017. The third season saw Jessica Queller and Robert Rovner become the series' executive producers and co-showrunners along with Kreisberg until his firing, following Adler's departure; Adler will remain an executive consultant for the series. Both Queller and Rovner joined Supergirl midway through the first season as co-executive producer and consulting producer, respectively, with Rovner promoted to executive producer ahead of the second season.

On April 2, 2018, The CW renewed the series for a fourth season, which premiered on October 14, 2018. On January 31, 2019, The CW renewed the series for a fifth season. The fifth season premiered on October 6, 2019. On January 7, 2020, the CW renewed the series for a sixth season, which premiered on March 30, 2021. On September 22, 2020, it was announced that the series would conclude after its sixth season.

Design

The costume for Supergirl was created by Colleen Atwood, who also designed the costumes for Arrow and The Flash. Benoist stated that she is aware of the costume worn by Kara in more modern depictions of the comics, and expressed that the often "micro-mini hemline" of the skirt could be "a little daunting ... but that's good. I like being pushed." Promotional photos of Benoist wearing Atwood's design were released on March 6, 2015. Atwood indicated that she wanted to "embrace the past ... but more importantly, thrust her into the street-style action hero of today." Atwood later revealed details about the costume such as the cape being fastened to an undersuit so as not to pull the costume and that the fabric used was Eurojersey. The reveal of the Martian Manhunter costume in "Human For a Day" was created through visual effects, though a physical version was created to appear in later episodes, with it proving to be one of the most challenging costumes for the costume team.

Reception of the Supergirl costume upon its reveal was mixed. Entertainment Weekly Natalie Abrams commented that the new look of the costume looks and feels different in a good way. The new costume avoids exposing the character's midriff, as it does in the Michael Turner version of the costume from the comics, as well as having Benoist wear tights underneath the skirt with over-the-knee boots. Abrams compared the texture of the costume to that worn by Henry Cavill as Superman in Man of Steel, as well as the positioning of the cape on the suit, and the decision to do away with the bright blue and red color scheme. Andrew Dyce, from Screen Rant, found the new costume to perfectly balance itself between classic nostalgia and modernism. The Washington Post noted that Atwood's design was successful, praising her ability to take "cartoon-y tints" and moving them to darker tones.

E! Online was less impressed with the design, negatively comparing it to a "cheap Halloween costume", with washed out colors, and not buying into the "gritty, 'street style'" look Atwood was intending. TV Guide questioned Atwood's design, and noted that although the promotional image has Benoist trying to appear as a powerful hero, the thigh-high boots and pleated skirt comes across as a "model advertising a moderately-priced Halloween costume".

The suit was redesigned in season five to include pants rather than the traditional skirt.

Filming
In February 2015, it was announced that Andrew Kreisberg, co-creator of Arrow and The Flash, had joined the series as a writer and executive producer; and Arrow / The Flash and Smallville alum Glen Winter was announced to be directing the pilot. Principal photography for the pilot took place from March 4 to March 29, 2015. Filming locations included the Warner Bros. lot, where Lois & Clark was shot. Each episode cost approximately $3 million to broadcast, which is one of the highest license fees ever for a first-year show.

The second season was filmed in Vancouver, rather than Los Angeles where the first season was shot. This was done to reduce the high production costs of the series, one of the issues that made CBS wary to renew the series on their network. Filming for the third season began in Vancouver on July 6, 2017, and ended on April 28, 2018. On March 12, 2020, Warner Bros. Television shut down production on the series due to the COVID-19 pandemic. Season six was scheduled to begin filming on September 28, 2020, and conclude on April 5, 2021, but has been temporarily postponed because of delays in receiving COVID-19 test results for the cast and crew.

Broadcast
In Canada, Supergirl aired in a sim-subbed simulcast on Global with the American broadcast in the first season; the second season saw it move to Showcase in the same arrangement.

The series premiered on October 29, 2015, in the United Kingdom on Sky One. The series premiered in Australia on December 6, 2015, on FOX8.

Reception

Critical response

Review aggregation website Rotten Tomatoes gave the first season a 92% approval rating from critics with an average rating of 7.53/10, based on 72 reviews. The site's consensus states: "Melissa Benoist shines as Superman's plucky little cousin in Supergirl, a family-friendly comic-book adaptation that ditches cynicism for heart." Metacritic, which uses a weighted average, reported "generally favorable reviews" with an assigned score of 75 out of 100, based on reviews from 38 critics. Cliff Wheatley of IGN gave the pilot episode a 7/10, praising Melissa Benoist's performance as Kara and the fun take on the Superman mythos.

Rotten Tomatoes gave the second season a 92% approval rating from critics with an average rating of 7.88/10, based on 20 reviews. The site's consensus reads, "The arrival of the more famous cousin in Supergirl does nothing to detract from the show's lead, who continues to deliver strength, action, and relatability." Metacritic reported "universal acclaim" with an assigned score of 81 out of 100, based on reviews from 4 critics.

The third season holds an 78% approval rating on Rotten Tomatoes based on 15 reviews, with an average rating of 6.9/10. The critical consensus states: "Heavier themes lead to higher stakes, but Supergirl gives its eponymous heroine and her fellow supers plenty of room for growth, creating a well-balanced, engaging third season."

The fourth season reports an 87% approval rating, with an average rating of 7.27/10 based on 7 reviews. The website's critic consensus reads: "Though it's a little tonally inconsistent, Supergirls fourth season still soars thanks to strong, relevant writing brought to life by its charming cast." The book Adapting Superman: Essays on the Transmedia Man of Steel includes the chapter "Forging Kryptonite: Lex Luthor's Xenophobia as Societal Fracturing, from Batman v Superman to Supergirl," which analyzes Lex Luthor's actions in Season 4 "as a representation exploring the cultural effects of encroaching xenophobia" from society to the family in the years following the 2016 United States presidential election.

Ratings

Accolades

Critics' top ten lists2015 critics' top ten lists No. 10 People
 Unranked – Variety
 No. 7 The Washington Post2016 critics' top ten lists'''
 No. 5 Cinema BlendArrowverse

In November 2014, Berlanti expressed interest in Supergirl existing in the Arrowverse, the same universe as his other series Arrow and The Flash, and in January 2015, The CW president Mark Pedowitz revealed that he was also open to a crossover between the series and networks (due to Berlanti executive producing all three and The CW being co-owned by CBS). However, CBS Entertainment chair Nina Tassler stated that month that "those two shows are on a different network. So I think we'll keep Supergirl to ourselves for a while." In August 2015, Tassler revealed that while there were no plans at the time to do crossover storylines, the three series would have crossover promotions.

Pedowitz regretted passing on the series when presented it in mid-2014, saying, "We hadn't launched The Flash yet, we weren't ready to take on another DC property. In hindsight we probably should've gone that direction...Sometimes you lose great shows." In January 2016, during the Television Critics Association press tour, he said that The CW was still interested in a crossover with Supergirl if the producers could find a way to do it, and Berlanti added that while no official conversations had taken place, internal ones had concerning how a crossover would work. He also noted that for a crossover to happen during Supergirl first season, it would have to be figured out "in the next month or so". Glenn Geller, Tassler's successor at CBS, then stated on the matter, "I have to be really careful what I say here. Watch and wait and see what happens."

On February 3, 2016, it was announced that Grant Gustin, who appears as Barry Allen / Flash on The Flash, would appear in the eighteenth episode of the first season, "Worlds Finest". While no plot details on the episodes were released at the time, Ross A. Lincoln of Deadline Hollywood noted that "the in-universe reason" for the crossover was due to Barry's ability to travel to various dimensions, thus implying that Supergirl exists on an alternate Earth to Arrow and The Flash in a multiverse. The Flash episode "Welcome to Earth-2" confirmed this, showing an image of Benoist as Supergirl during a sequence where characters travel through that multiverse. The earth that the series inhabits is Earth-38 in the Arrowverse multiverse, and has been informally referred to as "Earth-CBS" by Marc Guggenheim, one of the creators of Arrow.

During the second season, Supergirl appears in "Invasion!", a crossover episode of The Flash, Arrow and Legends of Tomorrow, when she's recruited by Barry Allen and Cisco Ramon at the end of "Medusa" to help fight off an invasion by the Dominators. Supergirl and The Flash also featured in a musical crossover, featuring several covers of existing songs along with two original numbers. Similar to "Invasion!", the crossover begins at the end of the Supergirl episode "Star-Crossed" and primarily takes place during The Flash episode "Duet", featuring the Music Meister as the antagonist who puts both The Flash and Supergirl in a shared hallucination. After "Invasion!", Guggenheim felt "If there's an appetite for it from the fans and from the network," the crossover next year could be "a proper four-part crossover."

At the 2017 Paleyfest event, Kreisberg reiterated the creative team's intention to do a full four-way crossover the following year. At San Diego Comic Con 2017, it was confirmed that another four-way crossover would take place, with Supergirl playing a larger role than the previous season. The four-way crossover event, titled "Crisis on Earth-X", took place on November 27 and 28, 2017, across Supergirl and Arrow (on the first night) and The Flash and Legends of Tomorrow (on the second night).

In May 2018, Arrow star Stephen Amell announced at The CW upfronts that the next Arrowverse crossover would feature Batwoman and Gotham City. The crossover, titled "Elseworlds", aired in December 2018, ahead of a potential 2019 solo series for the character. Supergirl was confirmed to have a participating episode in August, which closed out the three-part crossover, trading nights with The Flash just for the event. Therefore, the show's participating episode aired on Tuesday, December 11. The end of "Elseworlds" teased the next crossover event, "Crisis on Infinite Earths". Supergirls episode opened the five-part crossover on December 8, 2019, with the final two installments airing on January 14, 2020. At the end of the event, the new Earth-Prime was formed, which saw Earth-38 merged with the former Earth-1 and Black Lightnings earth, creating a fictional universe where all of the CW series exist together.

Standalone spin-off

In October 2019, The CW and Warner Bros. Television announced development on a spin-off series titled Superman & Lois, with Tyler Hoechlin and Elizabeth Tulloch reprising their roles as Clark Kent/Superman and Lois Lane. In January 2020, Superman & Lois was ordered to series. The series premiered on February 23, 2021. Originally presented as being set in the same continuity as Supergirl, the series was retroactively established to be set in an adjacent universe to the Arrowverse in its second season finale.

Other media

Comic books
In July 2015, a four-page preview comic entitled Sister Act, written by Ali Adler, Greg Berlanti and Andrew Kreisberg was released digitally online, and then a day later in the September 2015 issue of TV Guide.Adventures of Supergirl': Beginning in January 2016, DC Comics launched a 13-issue bi-weekly digital comic (6 in print). Written by Sterling Gates and drawn by a rotating team of artist including Bengal, Jonboy Meyers, Emanuela Lupacchino, and Emma Vieceli, the comic, while not directly tying into the show, tells stories set in the universe of the show. The digital series was collected in print as a six-issue series published twice a month from May to July 2016, and as a complete graphic novel in September of that year.

They are also involved in the Earth-Prime miniseries launched in April 2022.
 Adventures of Supergirl (2016-09-21): Includes Adventures of Supergirl #1-6.

Novels
In November 2017, Abrams Books began publishing a new trilogy of Supergirl novels, written by Jo Whittemore, aimed at middle-grade readers in tandem with a similar trilogy of The Flash novels. The first, Supergirl: Age of Atlantis, was released on November 7, 2017, and features Supergirl dealing with a surge of new powered people in National City, as well as a mysterious humanoid sea creature captured by the DEO who is seemingly attracted by the new superpowered people. A sequel, Supergirl: Curse of the Ancients, was released on May 1, 2018, with a third novel, titled Supergirl: Master of Illusion, released on January 8, 2019.

Guidebook
A guidebook for the series, published by Abrams, was released on March 12, 2019. Supergirl: The Secret Files of Kara Danvers: The Ultimate Guide to the Hit TV Show features "detailed profiles on characters and super powers, a heroes and villains gallery, episode guide, and more" from the first three seasons of the series.

Video games
The video game Lego DC Super-Villains features DLC inspired by Supergirl'' in the "DC Super Heroes: TV Series DLC Character Pack". The DLC pack includes Supergirl as a playable character.

Home media

References

General references

External links

  (only available in the United States)
 
 DC page: TV series, comic (AOS2016)
 

 
2010s American drama television series
2010s American LGBT-related drama television series
2010s American science fiction television series
2015 American television series debuts
2020s American drama television series
2020s American LGBT-related drama television series
2020s American science fiction television series
2021 American television series endings
American action adventure television series
American adventure television series
American superhero television series
CBS original programming
The CW original programming
Discrimination in fiction
English-language television shows
Lesbian-related television shows
LGBT-related superhero television shows
Mars in television
Saturn Award-winning television series
Superheroine television shows
Superman television series
Television series about parallel universes
Television series about sisters
Television series by Warner Bros. Television Studios
Television series created by Ali Adler
Television series created by Andrew Kreisberg
Television series created by Greg Berlanti
Television shows about telepathy
Television shows based on DC Comics
Television shows filmed in Los Angeles
Television shows filmed in Vancouver
Television shows set in the United States
Transgender-related television shows
White House in fiction